The women's Individual Pursuit at the 2004 Summer Olympics (Cycling) was an event that consisted of matches between two cyclists. The riders would start at opposite ends of the track. They had 12 laps (3 kilometres) in which to catch the other cyclist. If neither was caught before one had gone 12 laps, the times for the distance were used to determine the victor. In the twelve matches of the 2004 event, one cyclist was lapped.

Records

Ulmer held the world record coming into this event, which she set at the world championships in Melbourne in May 2004.  She reduced the world record by more than 6 seconds during this event. All three of the medallists in Athens beat the previous world record.

WR denotes world record
Q denotes qualification for next round

Qualifying round
The riders raced against each other in matches of two. Qualification for the next round was not based on who won those matches, however. The cyclists with the eight fastest times advanced, regardless of whether they won or lost their match.  This resulted in the first two heats not having any riders advance while the next four heats each had both winners and losers advance.

First round
In the first round of actual match competition, cyclists were seeded into matches based on their times from the qualifying round. The fastest cyclist faced the eighth-fastest, the second-fastest faced the third, and so forth. Winners advanced to the finals while losers in each match received a final ranking based on their time in the round.

Finals
In the women's individual pursuit finals, the current world champion and world record holder, Sarah Ulmer from New Zealand, set a new world record in the final for a time of 3:24.537 for the gold medal. It is the first time New Zealand has ever won a cycling gold medal. The Australian, Katie Mactier (3:27.650), set a very fast first 1000 m of 1:10.618, with a lead of one second, but Ulmer reversed this lead in the second 1000 m, and went on to win the pursuit by 3 seconds. Netherlands rider and former world champion, Leontien Ziljaard-van Moorsel rode a time of 3:27.037 for the bronze defeating Australian, Katherine Bates (3:31.715)

Final classification

References

External links
Official Olympic Report

W
Cycling at the Summer Olympics – Women's individual pursuit
Track cycling at the 2004 Summer Olympics
Olymp
Women's events at the 2004 Summer Olympics